The Fulham Road Jewish Cemetery (also called Fulham Cemetery and formerly known as the Brompton Jewish Cemetery) is a Jewish cemetery on Fulham Road in the Royal Borough of Kensington and Chelsea. A locked door  on the Fulham Road serves as the entrance to the cemetery, otherwise it is not visible from the street. The cemetery is overlooked by the blocks of flats that surround it.

It has been described as a "tiny" cemetery that is "totally unexpected in the Fulham Road" and creates an impression "more typical of Prague than London".

The cemetery is owned by the Western Charitable Foundation, and is open only by appointment.

History
It was opened in 1815 as the burial ground for the Western Synagogue, now Western Marble Arch Synagogue. The site was purchased in December 1815 for £400. An office building and prayer hall originally stood near the entrance. The cemetery closed in 1885 although burials in reserved plots continued until 1910.

It was the first Jewish burial ground west of the City of London. It was restored in 1898 funded by a Mr Ellis Franklin, whose parents were buried here, with the maintenance of the cemetery funded by £20,000 from the estate of Adel Hopkins (née Rootstein). The Edmonton cemetery was subsequently established by the Western Synagogue in 1884.

Notable burials
 Herschell Filipowski (1816–1872), Lithuanian-born  Hebraist, editor, mathematician, linguist and actuary who was elected a Fellow of the Society of Antiquaries of London
 Solomon Hart (1806–1881), artist and professor of painting at the Royal Academy (RA) from 1854 to 1863. Hart was the first Jewish member of the RA
 Zadok Jessel (1792–1864), businessman and the father of the Master of the Rolls Sir George Jessel
 Joseph Waley (1818–1873), first president of the Anglo-Jewish Association and professor of political economy at London University
 Simon Waley (1827–1875), stockbroker, pianist and composer

See also
 Jewish cemeteries in the London area

References

External links

 
  Cemetery Scribes: Brompton (Fulham Rd) Jewish Cemetery
 Royal Borough of Kensington and Chelsea Local Studies blog – Hidden in plain sight: Chelsea's Jewish cemetery

1815 establishments in England
Fulham Road Jewish Cemetery
Buildings and structures in the Royal Borough of Kensington and Chelsea
Cemeteries in London
Jewish cemeteries in the United Kingdom